Mike Morley (born June 17, 1946) is an American golf course architect and a former professional golfer who played on the PGA Tour for 14 years.

Early life 
Born in Morris, Minnesota, Morley was raised there and in Minot, North Dakota, where his family later moved during his youth. He graduated from high school in La Jolla, California, in 1964 and then attended Arizona State University in Tempe and was a two-time first-team All-American on the Sun Devil golf team in 1967 and 1968.

Professional career 
Morley won a handful of tournaments as a professional, including the satellite 1972 Magnolia State Classic, and the 1977 Ed McMahon-Jaycees Quad Cities Open; both events were opposite major championships. He had a great deal of success at the Bing Crosby Pro-Am finishing in the top-10 four times including a solo 2nd in 1976. His best finish in a major was a tie for eighth at the U.S. Open in 1980 at Baltusrol.

After losing his PGA Tour card in 1984, Morley played on an Asian Tour for two or three years. When he retired as a tour professional, Morley first tried selling real estate in Arizona, but found that golf course architecture and design was the business that he wanted to pursue. Early in this phase of his career, he worked for Tom Watson's firm. Today he is a partner in a golf course architecture and design business with fellow former PGA Tour golfer Dan Halldorson. Most of the courses Morley has designed are in Minnesota.
 
Morley was inducted into the North Dakota Golf Hall of Fame in 1977, and is also a member of the Arizona State University Hall of Fame. He was voted Mr. Golf for 2002 by the Minnesota Golf Association, and lives in Minot, North Dakota.

Amateur wins
mid-1960s Two North Dakota State Amateur Opens

Professional wins (11)

PGA Tour wins (1)

Other regular wins (9)
1972 Magnolia State Classic
1973 Shreveport Open, North Dakota Open
1975 Minnesota State Open
1978 North Dakota Open
1982 Minnesota State Open
1983 Minnesota State Open, Arizona Open
1986 Arizona Open

Senior wins (1)
2003 Minnesota Senior Open

Results in major championships

Note: Morley never played in The Open Championship.

CUT = missed the half-way cut
"T" indicates a tie for a place

See also 

 Fall 1969 PGA Tour Qualifying School graduates

References

External links

Arizona State University Athletics

American male golfers
Arizona State Sun Devils men's golfers
PGA Tour golfers
Golf course architects
Golfers from Minnesota
Golfers from North Dakota
People from Morris, Minnesota
Sportspeople from Minot, North Dakota
1946 births
Living people